Esperanza, Texas may refer to:
Esperanza, Hudspeth County, Texas, an unincorporated community
Esperanza, Montgomery County, Texas, a ghost town